The Tomtor mine is a large mine located in the Sakha Republic. Tomtor represents one of the largest phosphates reserve in Russia having estimated reserves of 500 million tonnes of ore grading 35% P2O5.

References 

Phosphate mines in Russia
Sakha Republic